Pavle Vujević (Serbian Cyrillic: Павле Вујевић, 10 August 1881 – 17 November 1966) was a Serbian geographer and meteorologist, professor of climatology, meteorology, and mathematical geography at the University of Belgrade. He was a founder of the science of micro-climatology, and one of the first in the science of potamology, the study of rivers.

Work
Serbia undertook some significant developments in meteorology with academics Pavle Vujević, Director of Belgrade Observatory at the time, and renowned climatology pioneer Milutin Milanković, who was a good friend of Vujević's.

Vujević is famous for his book Basis of Mathematical and Physical Geography. He wrote about the island of Hvar, and proved that Hvar is a better place for healing than other resorts along the Mediterranean coastline. Also, an outstanding potamological study of the Tisa river was made by Vujović in 1906.

He was a full member of Serbian Academy of Sciences and Arts and a recipient of numerous awards.

References

Serbian geographers
Academic staff of the University of Belgrade
1966 deaths
1881 births
Yugoslav geographers